The In Crowd is a 1988 American teen drama film directed by Mark Rosenthal and written by Rosenthal and his long-time writing partner Lawrence Konner.  The period piece set in the 1960s features music of the era, including "Land of a Thousand Dances" and the instrumental "Cast Your Fate to the Wind" by Vince Guaraldi.

Plot
In the mid 1960s Philadelphia, Perry Parker (Joe Pantoliano) is a local dance-show host who aspires to rival Dick Clark. Del Green (Donovan Leitch) is an honors student who dreams about dancing with Vicky (Jennifer Runyon), the show's most popular dancer who attends a parochial school. However Vicky is in love with her dancing partner Dugan (Scott Plank).

Del sneaks to the sound stage right on the day when Dugan misses the show. Someone from the ‘In Crowd’, a group of show's featured dancers, needs to step up as Vicky’s partner, but the other boys are hesitating, knowing Dugan's bad temper. Del takes the chance and his first appearance with Vicky is a big hit. His school friends can’t believe that Del is so hip and ‘alive’ while dancing, but Del's next door neighbor and childhood friend Gail (Wendy Gazelle), who has a crush on Del, is not happy with his new acquaintances and considers them the 'wrong crowd' for him.

Del is accepted to the ‘In Crowd’ and Perry requires Del to attend their evening outing with Vicky. Del picks up Vicky at her home and her father Tiny, a policeman, is happy to see her with a smart college bound young man, a sharp contrast with Dugan who can barely read. However at the outing Vicky sneaks away with Dugan, and Del is waiting until she returns and takes her home to alleviate Tiny's suspicions. There are several more outings, but each time Vicky runs off with Dugan. Del feels used by Vicky and refuses to be a party to her secret romance. Eventually they make up, and Del learns that Vicky and Dugan plan to run off to Hollywood and become movie stars, and vows to help them.

Perry's show is cancelled and the ‘In Crowd’ give their last wild dance. Del then borrows a Cadillac from Gail's father so he can get Vicky out to meet up and leave with Dugan. Tiny tries to stop the couple and Del crashes into Tiny's police car, helping Vicky escape on Dugan’s motorcycle.

As a consequence, Del is grounded in his room. Gail comes by to play a new kind of music - rock music. She wears a leather headband, mini-skirt and high top suede boots.  Del is stunned by her new appearance.  She's holding Bob Dylan's "Highway 61 Revisited" album.  Gail puts the LP on a turntable and plays the first song on side 1: "Like A Rolling Stone".

Cast
 Donovan Leitch as Del Green
 Joe Pantoliano as Perry Parker
 Peter Boyle  as Uncle Pete Boyle
 Scott Plank as Dugan
 Jennifer Runyon as Vicky
 Bruce Kirby as Morris
 Wendy Gazelle as Gail
 Sean Gregory Sullivan as 'Popeye'
 Charlotte d'Amboise as Ina
 Page Hannah as Lydia
 Mark Soper as Station Manager
 Freddie Ganno as Orson
 Richard Schave as Tucker
 Matthew Nasatir as Bernstein
 John R. Russell as Ming
 Elliott Alexander as Jack Goron

References

External links 

1988 films
American dance films
Films scored by Mark Snow
Films set in the 1960s
Films set in Philadelphia
Films shot in New Jersey
Films shot in Pennsylvania
Orion Pictures films
1980s English-language films
1980s American films